Johnston Historic District is a national historic district in Johnston, Edgefield County, South Carolina. The district encompasses 127 contributing buildings, 16 contributing sites, 1 contributing structure, and 1 contributing object in the village of Johnston. The district includes commercial and residential properties from approximately 1880 to 1920. They are in a variety of popular architectural styles such as Italianate, Second Empire, Victorian, Queen Anne, and Neo-Classical. The district also includes three churches and the town's cemetery. The railroad, which passes through Johnston, was the primary cause for the creation of the town and continues to be a reminder of the town's early transportation history. Notable buildings include the Johnston Depot, Western Carolina Bank, H. W. Crouch Building, Bank of Johnston (now Jone's Coin Laundry), Crouch-Halford House, and Johnston First Baptist Church.

It was listed on the National Register of Historic Places in 1983.

References

Historic districts on the National Register of Historic Places in South Carolina
Victorian architecture in South Carolina
Queen Anne architecture in South Carolina
Italianate architecture in South Carolina
Neoclassical architecture in South Carolina
Second Empire architecture in South Carolina
Buildings and structures in Edgefield County, South Carolina
National Register of Historic Places in Edgefield County, South Carolina